John Simmons (June 14, 1918 – September 19, 1979) was an American jazz bassist.

Life
Simmons played trumpet at first, but a sports injury prevented him from continuing on the instrument. He picked up bass instead, landing his first professional gigs a mere four months after starting on the instrument. Early on he played with Nat King Cole and Teddy Wilson (1937), then moved to Chicago, Illinois, where he played with Jimmy Bell, King Kolax, Floyd Campbell, and Johnny Letman. He played with Roy Eldridge in 1940 and spent 1941-42 playing at various times with Benny Goodman, Cootie Williams, and Louis Armstrong. In 1942-43, he played in the CBS Blue Network Orchestra, then played with Duke Ellington (1943), Eddie Heywood (1945), and Illinois Jacquet (1946), in addition to doing much studio work.

He continued to work as a studio musician for much of the 1950s, and also played with Erroll Garner (1950–52), Harry "Sweets" Edison (1955), Art Tatum (1955), and the Rolf Ericson/Duke Jordan band (1956). One of his last associations was with Phineas Newborn in 1960; ill health forced his retirement not long afterwards.

In addition to the above, Simmons also recorded with Lester Young, James P. Johnson, Hot Lips Page, Ben Webster, Billie Holiday, Tadd Dameron, Sidney DeParis, Sid Catlett, Coleman Hawkins, Don Byas, Benny Carter, Bill DeArango, Al Casey, Ella Fitzgerald, Charles Thompson, Thelonious Monk, and Erroll Garner.

He died in September 1979, at the age of 61.

He is the father of Joan Simmons, Kathleen Simmons, Addie Simmons, and NBC New York newscaster Sue Simmons.

Discography
With Louis Bellson
Skin Deep (Norgran, 1953) 
With Tadd Dameron
Fontainebleau (Prestige, 1956)
Mating Call (Prestige, 1957)
With Roy Eldridge and Benny Carter
Urbane Jazz (Verve, 1955)
With Maynard Ferguson
Jam Session featuring Maynard Ferguson (EmArcy, 1954)
With Matthew Gee
Jazz by Gee (Riverside, 1956)
With Milt Jackson
Wizard of the Vibes (Blue Note, 1948)With Phineas Newborn, Jr.Piano Portraits by Phineas Newborn (Roulette, 1959)
I Love a Piano (Roulette, 1959)With Buddy Rich'Buddy and Sweets (Norgan, 1955)The Wailing Buddy Rich'' (Norgran, 1955)

References
Footnotes

General references
Scott Yanow, [ John Simmons] at AllMusic

1918 births
1979 deaths
Musicians from Oklahoma
American jazz double-bassists
Male double-bassists
20th-century American musicians
Jazz musicians from Oklahoma
20th-century double-bassists
20th-century American male musicians
American male jazz musicians